Alexander Volkov was the defending champion, but  lost to Daniel Vacek in the quarterfinal.Carl-Uwe Steeb won in the final 7–6(7–5), 3–6, 7–6(8–6) against Daniel Vacek.

Seeds

Draw

Finals

Top half

Bottom half

External links
 Draw

Kremlin Cup
Kremlin Cup